Frank Mitchell Tuerkheimer (born July 27, 1939) is an American lawyer, legal professor, and former prosecutor. He was an associate Watergate special prosecutor and served as the U.S. Attorney for the Western District of Wisconsin. He is also an emeritus professor of law at University of Wisconsin Law School.

Biography 
Tuerkheimer was born in New York City on July 27, 1939. His father was a cattle merchant who fled Nazi Germany to become a New York butcher. He graduated from the Bronx High School of Science in 1956 and received his B.A. from Columbia University in 1960. He received his LL.B. from New York University School of Law in 1963 as a Root-Tilden Scholar and Notes Editor of the New York University Law Review. After law school worked as a clerk for Judge Edward Weinfeld of the United States District Court for the Southern District of New York.

His first public post was legal assistant to the Attorney General of Swaziland and helped write the country's first Constitution. In 1965, Tuerkheimer returned to the United States and became an assistant to Robert Morgenthau, then the United States Attorney for the Southern District of New York. He was Assistant U.S. Attorney until 1970, when he joined the faculty of the University of Wisconsin Law School.

From 1973 to 1975, Tuerkheimer served as an Associate Special Prosecutor to the Watergate Special Prosecution Force, taking a leave of absence from his teaching position. As prosecutor, he hed the investigation into illegal dairy industry contributions and was chief trial counsel in the case against John Connally. 

He was appointed by President Jimmy Carter to serve as U.S. Attorney for the Western District of Wisconsin in 1977 and served in that position until 1981. 

Tuerkheimer has written about Holocaust trials as well as the Eichmann trial. His other areas of research have focused on evidence and litigation.

Personal life and family 
Tuerkheimer married Barbara Wolfson in 1968, and the couple has two children. His daughter, Deborah Tuerkheimer, is the Class of 1967 James B. Haddad Professor of Law at Northwestern University Pritzker School of Law.

References 

1939 births
American legal scholars
American lawyers
Columbia College (New York) alumni
Living people
New York University School of Law alumni
The Bronx High School of Science alumni
United States Attorneys for the Western District of Wisconsin
University of Wisconsin Law School alumni
Watergate scandal investigators